is a former Japanese football player.

Playing career
Nakashima was born in Hirado on January 15, 1976. After dropped out from Waseda University, he joined Urawa Reds in September 1994. On October, 26, he debuted as left side midfielder and scored a goal against Nagoya Grampus Eight. After the debut, he played all matches in 1994 season. However he could hardly play in the match from 1995 season, he moved to Avispa Fukuoka in 1997. However he could not play at all in the match and retired end of 1997 season.

Club statistics

References

External links

1976 births
Living people
Waseda University alumni
Association football people from Nagasaki Prefecture
Japanese footballers
J1 League players
Urawa Red Diamonds players
Avispa Fukuoka players
Association football defenders